The Ladies Slovak Open was a golf tournament on the Ladies European Tour. It was last played at the Golf Resort Tale in Brezno, Slovakia.

Winners

External links
Coverage on the Ladies European Tour's official site

Former Ladies European Tour events
Golf in Slovakia
Summer events in Slovakia
Recurring sporting events established in 2010
Recurring sporting events disestablished in 2014